Baltimore County Council could be:
Baltimore Area Council of the Boy Scouts of America
Baltimore County Council, part of the Baltimore County, Maryland government